Preston House, also known as the John Cole House and Johns(t)on House, is a historic home located at Salem, Virginia. It was built about 1821, and is a two-story, five bay, Federal style brick I-house dwelling. It features a single pile, central passage plan and original rear ell, its exterior end chimneys and decorative brick cornices.

It was added to the National Register of Historic Places in 2005, with a boundary amendment in 2006.

References

Houses on the National Register of Historic Places in Virginia
Federal architecture in Virginia
Houses completed in 1821
Houses in Salem, Virginia
National Register of Historic Places in Salem, Virginia